Bátaszék is a town in Tolna County, Hungary. The majority residents are Hungarians, with a minority of Serbs.

"The oldest tree of Bátaszék" won the title of European Tree of the Year 2016.

The Roman Catholic writer Miklós Bátori was born in Bátaszék.

History
During World War II, Bátaszék was captured on 28 November 1944 by Red Army troops of the 3rd Ukrainian Front in the course of the Budapest Offensive.

Sport
Bátaszéki SE, association football club

Twin towns — sister cities
Bátaszék is twinned with:

  Besigheim, Germany
  Ditrău, Romania
  Tekovské Lužany, Slovakia

Gallery

References

External links

Street map 

Populated places in Tolna County
Serb communities in Hungary
Hungarian German communities